Drasteria kabylaria is a moth of the family Erebidae first described by Andreas Bang-Haas in 1906. It is found from the western and central parts of the Sahara, to the Arabian Peninsula, Jordan, Sinai, south to Oman.

There are two generations per year. Adults are on wing in from March to May and October to November.

The larvae probably feed on Tamarix species.

References

External links

Image

Drasteria
Fauna of Mauritania
Invertebrates of the Arabian Peninsula
Moths of the Middle East
Moths described in 1906